Take Me Where the Good Times Are is a novel by Robert Cormier. First published in 1965, it is Cormier's third novel.

Plot 
This story features Tommy Bartin, a 70-year-old resident at the Dorchester County, Maryland poorhouse. When another resident leaves Tommy some cash, he sees his opportunity to go back to the area he grew up in. However, Tommy finds that his old town has changed substantially over time, and he hopes to find a way to be useful again, and to regain his self-respect.

Themes
Themes in this story include the quality of denial and facing reality even if it is undesirable.

References

1965 American novels
Novels by Robert Cormier
Novels set in Maryland
Dorchester County, Maryland
Macmillan Publishers books